Route 16 is a  east–west state highway in Massachusetts. It begins in the west at an intersection with Route 12 and Route 193 in Webster, just north of the Connecticut state border.  It runs in a generally southwest-northeast routing through a number of Boston's suburbs and runs to the west and then north of the city before ending in Revere at an intersection with Route 1A and Route 60.

Much of Route 16 east of the Newton-Wellesley town line, and especially from Cambridge eastward, is a multi-lane parkway, although it is not limited access for any significant length of road. Segments of Route 16 are also known as the Mystic Valley Parkway, the Alewife Brook Parkway, and the Revere Beach Parkway, among other names.

From the western end of the Route 135 concurrency in Wellesley to Route 30 (Commonwealth Avenue) in Newton, the route serves as a part of the Boston Marathon, from the halfway point to just before Mile 18 and the hills.

Route description

Webster to Milford
Route 16 begins at Routes 12 and 193, not far from the Connecticut border. In Webster, along the shore of Lake Chaubunagungamaug, it intersects I-395.

After passing I-395, the route continues to the northeast, going through Douglas (with a trip through the Douglas State Forest), the Blackstone River Valley National Heritage Corridor, Uxbridge, Mendon, Hopedale, and Milford, where it crosses the Charles River and then passes beneath I-495 {without access}.

Milford to Newton
From I-495, Route 16 goes northeasterly past Holliston and the Elm Bank Reservation in Sherborn. The road then crosses into Natick while traveling next to the Dover line, and goes through Wellesley, where Wellesley College and Babson College are located. Entering Newton, the route travels past Lasell College before crossing into Middlesex County.

Newton to Revere

In Newton, Route 16 crosses Route 30 and Route 128 (Interstate 95), later crossing I-90, the Massachusetts Turnpike, in West Newton; Pike Exit 16 here provides access to and from the east only. It enters Watertown shortly before again crossing the Charles River, and intersects U.S. Route 20 in Watertown Square. Route 16 also contains trolleybuses from Watertown Square station until the intersection with Brattle Street. The route passes by Mount Auburn Cemetery before entering Cambridge. Continuing east, Route 16 joins U.S. Route 3 and Route 2, turning north to pass by Fresh Pond and the large parking garage at the MBTA Alewife Station. From there, Route 2 splits off at the eastern end of the freeway portion of the Concord Turnpike, while Routes 3 and 16 continue north on Alewife Brook Parkway.  Route 3 exits west at Massachusetts Avenue, while Route 16 continues north on the parkway into Somerville, meeting up with the Mystic Valley Parkway just south of the Mystic River.

Route 16 follows the Mystic Valley Parkway generally eastward, traveling beside the Mystic River downstream and eventually crossing it into Medford.  It soon is joined from the north by Massachusetts Route 38, and passes near Medford Square (after recrossing the river), where Route 38 exits to the south on Main Street.  Route 16 then crosses Interstate 93 in a series of ramps that include onramps to the north and south of I-93 from Route 16's eastbound lanes, and a ramp from I-93 southbound to Route 16 east.  Route 16 then crosses the Mystic River again, reaching the Wellington Circle junction with Massachusetts Route 28 in Medford.  This junction marks the end of the Mystic Valley Parkway and the beginning of the Revere Beach Parkway, on which Route 16 continues eastward, passing the Wellington MBTA station and crossing the Malden River. The route continues east through Everett (where it has an interchange with Massachusetts Route 99) and Chelsea, where it has an interchange with U.S. Route 1 at the border with Revere.  The stretch between Wellington Circle and Route 1 is characterized by a fairly dense mixture of residential, industrial, and commercial uses, in contrast to the more residential and park-like settings of the section between Wellington and Route 2.

Continuing eastward from Route 1, Route 16 has an interchange with Massachusetts Route 107 at Cronin Park before heading north to a junction with Winthrop Ave, where the Revere Beach Parkway and Massachusetts Route 145 turn right.  Route 16 goes a short way further north, before it ends near Revere Beach and the Atlantic Ocean at Timothy J. Mahoney Circle, a junction with Routes 1A and 60 in Revere.

History

Parts of Route 16 were historically maintained by the Metropolitan District Commission (MDC), and while the MDC no longer exists, the parkway portions of the route are still patrolled by the Massachusetts State Police and maintained by the Massachusetts Department of Conservation and Recreation as a remnant of the former MDC jurisdiction.

Major intersections

References

016
Parkways in the United States
Transportation in Middlesex County, Massachusetts
Transportation in Norfolk County, Massachusetts
Transportation in Suffolk County, Massachusetts
Transportation in Worcester County, Massachusetts
Holliston, Massachusetts